Quimbaya is a Pre-Columbian term. It may mean:
The Quimbaya civilization of western Colombia
Quimbaya, Quindío, a municipality in the department of Quindío in Colombia
Quimbaya, an extinct Choco language